Ivan Dodig and Júlio Silva were the defending champions, however only Dodig chose to play this year. He competed with Lovro Zovko. They lost to Brian Dabul and Leonardo Mayer in the first round.
Peter Luczak and Alessandro Motti won in the final 6–4, 6–4, against Brendan Evans and Ryan Sweeting.

Seeds

Draw

Draw

External Links
 Doubles Draw

Zagreb Open - Doubles
Zagreb Open